Chiso Manchhe is a 2022 Nepali film written and directed by Dipendra K. Khanal under the banner of D.S. Digital Pvt. Ltd. It was released on June 17, 2022, and it features Arpan Thapa and Swastima Khadka in the lead roles. The filming took place in Bajura and Kathmandu.

Synopsis 
When a Nepalese worker dies in Qatar, his wife Puspa (Swastima Khadka) and father (Desh Bhakta Khanal) travel to Kathmandu to retrieve his body. They meet a driver (Arpan Thapa) there who offers to take them back to their hometown. The plot revolves around Puspa, who has spent her entire life in rural Nepal. Her journey from the city back home is the subject of the narrative.

Cast 

 Swastima Khadka as Puspa
 Arpan Thapa as Driver
 Desh Bhakta Khanal as Father
 Aashant Sharma
 Prabhakar Neupane
 Ram Babu Regmi

Soundtrack

Reception 
The film received mixed but mostly positive reviews from critics. Most critics acclaimed the film, though some felt it lacked redeeming qualities.

Devendra Bhattarai from Kantipur said: "Chiso Manchhe has the feel of pure Nepali soil. It is difficult to say how much the director Dipendra will earn from this film, which does not follow the formula. However, it is necessary for others to learn this blueprint of a comprehensive story that tries to weave such an original story."

Sukrit Nepal from Gorkhapatra praised the film's overall plot as well as the regional accents used by Swastima Khadka and Desh Bhakta Khanal. Their characters' costumes are also recognized for being relevant.

Annapurna Post has written: "The plot revolves around the character of Puspa, and there is no real plot, and the story does not progress as it should. The film ends while the audience is expecting something good."

References

External links 
 

Nepalese drama films
2022 films
2020s Nepali-language films
Cultural depictions of Nepalese women
2022 drama films